Roelof Bisschop (born 30 November 1956 in Staphorst) is a Dutch historian and politician. As a member of the Reformed Political Party (SGP) he has been an MP since 20 September 2012. Previously he was a member of the municipal council of Veenendaal from 1986 to 2007 and a member of the States-Provincial of Utrecht from 2003 to 2011.

Roelof Bisschop is a member of the Restored Reformed Church.

References 
 Parlement.com biography

1956 births
Living people
20th-century Dutch politicians
21st-century Dutch politicians
Dutch Calvinist and Reformed Christians
Dutch columnists
Dutch educators
20th-century Dutch historians
Members of the House of Representatives (Netherlands)
Members of the Provincial Council of Utrecht
Municipal councillors in Utrecht (province)
People from Veenendaal
People from Staphorst
Reformed Political Party politicians
Utrecht University alumni